Oscura Peak is a mountain summit in the Oscura Mountains in Socorro County, New Mexico.

References 

Mountains of New Mexico
Landforms of Socorro County, New Mexico
Mountains of Socorro County, New Mexico
White Sands Missile Range